

Plants

Conodonts

Dinosaurs 
 The only known fossils of Poekilopleuron are destroyed during the Allied liberation of Normandy.

Newly named dinosaurs 
Data are courtesy of George Olshevky's dinosaur genera list.

Plesiosaurs

New taxa

References

1940s in paleontology
Paleontology
Paleontology 4